Al-Faw Port is an Iraqi port. It lies in Basrah and is situated on the Persian Gulf. It is an oil port.

Ports and harbours of Iraq
Ports and harbours of the Arab League
Transport in the Arab League